Tezacaftor is a drug  used for the treatment of cystic fibrosis (CF) in people six years and older, who have a F508del mutation, the most common type of mutation in the CFTR gene. It is sold as a fixed-dose combination with ivacaftor under the brand name Symdeko. It was approved by the U.S. FDA in 2018. The combination of elexacaftor, tezacaftor, and ivacaftor is being sold as Trikafta.

In 2019, the U.S. Food and Drug Administration (FDA) approved a combination of elexacaftor, tezacaftor, and ivacaftor.

Mechanism of action
Tezacaftor acts as a corrector to help the folding and presentation of the CFTR protein to the cell surface, which improves its function for individuals with a F508del mutation.

Clinical trials
The EVOLVE and EXPAND study findings were published in 2017.

EVOLVE trial 
The EVOLVE trial analyzed tezacaftor/ivacaftor in patients with cystic fibrosis, specifically with the homozygous for Phe508del mutation. The EVOLVE trial is a phase 3, double-blinded, multicenter, randomized, placebo-controlled, parallel-group trial, that was which evaluated therapy with a combination of tezacaftor  and ivacaftor in patients that are 12 and older. 

510 patients were randomized and 509 patients were given either 100 mg of tezacaftor once daily and 150 mg of ivacaftor twice daily or a placebo for 24 weeks. The combination of drugs was efficacious in patients who had cystic fibrosis with the Phe508del mutation and the adverse effects in both treatment groups were similar.

History
The U.S. Food and Drug Administration (FDA) granted the application for tezacaftor and ivacaftor combination therapy orphan drug designation and priority review, and granted the approval of Symdeko to Vertex Pharmaceuticals Incorporated.

References

External links
 
 

Benzodioxoles
Cyclopropanes
Indoles
Organofluorides
Orphan drugs